Thankakudam is a 1965 Indian Malayalam film,  directed by S. S. Rajan. The film stars Prem Nazir, Sheela, Adoor Bhasi and T. S. Muthaiah in the lead roles. The film had musical score by M. S. Baburaj.

Cast
Prem Nazir
Sheela
Adoor Bhasi
T. S. Muthaiah
Ambika
Yashoda Palayad
Haji Abdul Rahman
Nilambur Ayisha
Philomina
Santhosh Kumar

Soundtrack

References

External links
 

1965 films
1960s Malayalam-language films
Films scored by M. S. Baburaj